Javier Jattin (April 24, 1983, Barranquilla, Colombia), is a Colombian actor and model. He is known for  Niños Ricos, Pobres Padres (Generation Y),  Primera Dama (The First Lady) and La mujer del Vendaval.

Filmography

References

External links 

1983 births
Colombian male television actors
Colombian male models
Colombian people of Lebanese descent
Living people
21st-century Colombian male actors